Tublje pri Hrpeljah is a village southeast of Hrpelje in the Municipality of Hrpelje-Kozina in the Littoral region of Slovenia close to the border with Croatia.

Name
The name of the settlement was changed from Tublje to Tublje pri Hrpeljah in 1953.

References

External links

Tublje pri Hrpeljah on Geopedia

Populated places in the Municipality of Hrpelje-Kozina